'Ruk Ter Yod Ruk' (Thai:รักเธอยอดรัก - which means Love You To The Tip of Love)is a Thai Romance Comedy Drama Lakorn, produced by Channel 3, a famous Thai television channel. The lakorn starring by Thrisadee "Por" Sahawong and Napapa "Pat" Tantakul as the leading roles as well as Notable supporting cast includes: Meji Pimaksiporn Wingomin, Warintorn Phanhakarn, and "Job" Nithi Samutkojorn.

Summary
Amwika is on a mission to seek revenge on Sakan, assuming that he caused her sister's death. She would do whatever it takes to hurt the one that took Apsorn's life and caused sadness to her beloved family. Sakarn, the innocent victim, is willing to accept the accusation because he longed to be around Amwika and allow her to release all her anger upon him. Sakan feels Amwika's pain and is there to care for her through all her troubles despite of understanding her true intentions.

Cast
Thrisadee Sahawong as Sakan (ทฤษฎี สหวงษ์)
Napapa Tantakul as Amwika (ณปภา ตันตระกูล)
Warintorn Phanhakarn as Sakun (วรินทร ปัญหกาญจน์)
Nithi Samutkojorn as Ekkachai (นิธิ สมุทรโคจร)
Annette Tate as Supaphan
Pimaksiporn Wingomin as Wimada (พิมพ์อักษิพร วินโกมินทร์)

Thai romance television series